Romanian passport is an international travel document issued to nationals of Romania, and may also serve as proof of Romanian citizenship. Besides enabling the bearer to travel internationally and serving as indication of Romanian citizenship, the passport facilitates the process of securing assistance from Romanian consular officials abroad or other European Union member states in case a Romanian consular is absent, if needed.

According to 09 January 2023  Henley Visa Restrictions Index, Romanian citizens can visit 175 countries without a visa or with a visa granted on arrival. Romanian citizens can live and work in any country within the EU as a result of the right of free movement and residence granted in Article 21 of the EU Treaty.

Every Romanian citizen is also a citizen of the European Union. The passport, along with the national identity card allows for free rights of movement and residence in any of the states of the European Union, European Economic Area and Switzerland. If a 3rd country doesn't host a Romanian Embassy, the bearer can request help from any other member state's embassy for consular protection.

History

The term for passport – name still in use today, which describe the general document travel under which Romanian travellers can travel beyond the borders of the Danube and the Habsburg Empire – first appears regulated in the Organic Regulations, which came into force in 1830 in Moldavia and 1831 in Wallachia. According to historical data, travellers were required to show a passport at the border of Wallachia both the consulate, and ravaged by road. Foreigners arrived in the country had to have a visa Romanian consulate, which was present at Agie, where passports are then released which could move anywhere in the country.

A historic milestone in the evolution of Romanian passport was the promulgation, on 19 March 1912 by King Carol I, the first modern laws related to passports. Thus, the "Law on paspoartelor" Romanian state introduced the first general principles regarding passports and border crossing mandatory for authorities and citizens. The law was structured XI articles, passport thus becoming national legal instruments needed to be used when Romanians travelling abroad.

Liberate the Ministry of Interior and county prefects, "paspoartele" were issued in the name of King and had small portable card format "size  , is composed of 20 pages numbered."
Each page had framed, a fund composed of national reasons, in light lilac colour, making apparent to stand above the coat of arms and having the word "Romania", and below the word "Pasport".

Evolution of the passports continued in the period before and during the Second World War, when new types of ordinary passports, service and diplomatic were introduced, some distinguished by a special technique of fastening (sticking, Stitching) tabs of covers, which create a fan effect.

Romanian People's Republic
Political and social changes occurring with the proclamation on 30 December 1947 of the Romanian People's Republic led authorities at the time to introduce into circulation passports with a new name of the state and a new heraldic.

Modern period
After the Romanian Revolution of 1989 and the collapse of the communist bloc Romanian authorities opened the country's borders, which led to an exodus of Romanian citizens wishing to travel abroad.

It was necessary that the organs with attributions issuing passports to circulate the Romanian travel documents to be aligned with international standards to be similar to those issued by other states.
Thus, in accordance with Government Decision no. 757 of 30 December 1993, starting June 1994, was introduced into circulation a new model of Romanian passport simple first Romanian travel document issued in accordance with international standards.

On 21 January 2002, the Romanian government introduced a new type of passport in a decision taken due to exacerbation of migration and the need to ensure greater security of documents, as in use European and international level at the time.

Like most countries in Southeast Europe, Romania has committed itself in the process of accession to the EU, assuming certain responsibilities to comply, just as member countries, rules and requirements designed to compete in a safe lifestyle, this signifying and harmonisation of legislation and issuing travel documents to comply with international and European. The adoption on 20 July 2005, Law no. 248 on the free movement of Romanian citizens abroad held in conditions that Romanian citizens could exercise their right of free movement abroad and the limits of this right.

In 2019 a new design was introduced for the passport. The new design has the country's 3D amended coat of arms which now contains a crown at the top of the eagle. On page 16, the passport holder must complete the particular details of a relative or friend who can be contacted in case of accident: full name, address and telephone.

Types
The types of passports are: 
Diplomatic
Business
Simple (biometric): valid for 10 years for applicants aged 18 or over, 5 years for applicants between 12 and 18 years of age, and 3 years for applicants under the age of 12;
Simple (temporary): valid for 12 months, issued as an emergency travel document.

Romania has begun issuing its biometric passport on 31 December 2008.observatordebacau.info

Application
The Ministry of Internal Affairs, through the Community Public Service of Issuance and Registration of Simple Passports, is responsible for the issuance and renewal of Romanian passports.

Description

Regular Romanian EU passports are burgundy red in colour, with the Romania Coat of Arms emblazoned in the centre of the front cover. The words "European Union", "Romania", and "passport" are inscribed above and below the coat of arms (in Romanian). The information page identifying the bearer and the issuing authority is on the first page, not numbered (the Romanian passport contains 32 pages, information written on the 32nd page of the passport). On the last page, the bearer fills in information regarding contact person (persons) in case of emergency. On the third cover (the inner back cover) there are instructions for the bearer how to use and how not to use the passport.

The carte de identitate can now be used to travel within the European Union.

Identity Information Page
The Romanian Passport includes the following data:
 Photo of Passport Holder
 Type (PE)
 Country Code (ROU)
 Passport No.
 Personal No. (CNP)
 Surname
 Given Names
 Citizenship (Unlike most passports, the Romanian passport lists citizenship instead of nationality.)
 Date of Birth
 Sex
 Place of Birth
 Date of Issue
 Date of Expiry
 Authority
 Holder's Signature

The information page ends with the Machine Readable Zone. The data page/information page is printed in Romanian, English and French.

Visa requirements

As of January 2023, Romanian citizens had visa-free or visa on arrival access to 175 countries and territories, making the Romanian Passport 17th in terms of travel freedom.

Foreign travel statistics

According to the statistics these are the numbers of Romanian visitors to various countries per annum in 2014:

Gallery of historic images

See also 
 Visa requirements for Romanian citizens
 Visa policy of the Schengen Area
 Passports of the European Union
 Romanian identity card
 Romanian nationality law
 Moldovan passport (Transnistrian)

References 

 Official site of the issuing authority
 Delta Air Lines – Visa & Passport Information
 Saint Lucia Tourist Site of Frequently Asked Questions: Do I need a Visa to Enter Saint Lucia?
 Visa Information For Foreigners – Republic of Turkey Ministry of Foreign Affairs

External links 

Europa Travelling in Europe 2010
Europa Summaries of EU Legislation

Passports by country
European Union passports